This is a list of notable sausage dishes, in which sausage is used as a primary ingredient or as a significant component of a dish.

Sausage dishes

 
 
 
 
 
 
 
 
 
 
 
 
 
 
 
 
 
 
 
 
 
 
 
 
 
 
 
 
 
 
 
 
 
 
  - Dish served in the United Kingdom and the Republic of Ireland consisting of small sausages (usually chipolatas) wrapped in bacon. They are a popular and traditional accompaniment to roast turkey in a Christmas dinner and are served as a side dish.

See also

 List of hot dogs
 List of sausages
 List of pork dishes
 List of smoked foods
 List of bacon dishes

References

Sausage